Spear Nunatak is a nunatak lying 3 nautical miles (6 km) south of Strickland Nunatak; apparently being the farthest south outcrop along the east side of the head of Reedy Glacier. Mapped by United States Geological Survey (USGS) from surveys and U.S. Navy air photos, 1960–64. Named by Advisory Committee on Antarctic Names (US-ACAN) for Milton B. Spear, construction electrician, a member of the wintering party at Byrd Station in 1962.

Nunataks of Marie Byrd Land